Swami Shankarananda, (born Amritalal Sengupta; 9 March 1880 – 13 January 1962) was the seventh President of the Ramakrishna Math and Ramakrishna Mission.  Join the Ramakrishna Math in 1902. As a student, he attended Swami Vivekananda’s lectures and was drawn to the monastic life by Swami Sadananda, his maternal uncle and a disciple of Swami Vivekananda. Amulya was initiated by Swami Brahmananda in 1906. As a beloved disciple and also as a personal attendant of Swami Brahmananda for several years, he had the rare privilege of living with the Swami and of visiting many Math and Mission centres and various places of pilgrimage all over India.

References

External links
Official Website of The Headquarters of Ramakrishna Math and Ramakrishna Mission (Belur Math)
https://vedantastl.org/swami-shankarananda-1951-1962/

Presidents of the Ramakrishna Order
Indian Hindu monks
1880 births
1962 deaths
Monks of the Ramakrishna Mission